The Rungrado 1st of May Stadium is a multi-purpose stadium occupying an area of  on Rungra Island, Pyongyang, North Korea. It opened on 1 May 1989, with its first major event being the 13th World Festival of Youth and Students. It is the second 
largest stadium in the world by seating capacity (after India's Narendra Modi Stadium), considering the re-estimated number of seats in 2014, and the second largest stadium in the world considering its official seating capacity.

Uses
The stadium is currently used for football matches, a few athletics events, and most often for the mass games of the Arirang Festival.

Design
The stadium's scalloped roof features 16 arches arranged in a ring, and resembles a magnolia blossom. It hosts events on a main pitch covering . The stadium was originally built with an official capacity of 150,000. After a 2014 remodel which included the replacement of some bench seating with individual seats, observers estimated a new capacity of approximately 114,000.

History
After the 1988 Summer Olympics had been awarded to Seoul, North Korea intensified its efforts to present itself as the legitimate Korean state. As part of these efforts, it successfully bid to organize the 13th World Festival of Youth and Students in Pyongyang in 1989. Massive construction projects were initiated in preparation for the festival, one of which was the Rungrado 1st of May Stadium. At the time of completion, it was the largest stadium ever built in Asia.

While the stadium is used for sporting events, it is more frequently the site of massive performances and shows celebrating President Kim Il-sung and the North Korean nation. In June–July 2002, it was the site of the giant Arirang Festival gymnastic and artistic performance. The extravaganza involved over 100,000 participants— double the number of spectators, and was open to foreigners. These performances are now an annual feature in Pyongyang, usually in August and September. The event was recognized by the Guinness Book of Records in 2007 as the largest gymnastics display ever, with 100,090 participants.

Collision in Korea, the largest professional wrestling pay-per-view event ever, was held at Rungrado Stadium on April 28–29, 1995. Attendance was 150,000 and 190,000, respectively, according to local authorities.

After a two-year renovation project, the stadium reopened in 2015. In July 2017, the Rungrado Stadium played host to six group stage matches as part of 2018 AFC U-23 Championship qualification.

In the September 2018 inter-Korean summit in Pyongyang, President Moon Jae-in of South Korea gave a speech with Chairman Kim Jong-un to 150,000 North Korean spectators. The speech has themes of unification, peace, and cooperation.

In July 2019, Kim Jong-un hosted Chinese Communist Party general secretary Xi Jinping to a special Grand Mass Gymnastics and Artistic performance called "Invincible Socialism", on the occasion of the 70th anniversary of China–North Korea relations.

In December 31st 2022, a concert was held on the grounds of the stadium, commemorating the New Year's Eve, which was presided over by Kim Jong-un and along with other high-profile Workers' Party of Korea officials.

Notable events
Opening and closing ceremonies of the 13th World Festival of Youth and Students in 1989
Collision in Korea professional wrestling event in 1995
2018 Inter-Korean Summit Pyongyang

Annual events
Arirang Festival
Pyongyang Marathon

See also 

 List of football stadiums in North Korea
 Strahov Stadium
 Yanggakdo Stadium

References

External links

 Rungnado May Day Stadium 360 degree panorama
 Rungnado May Day Stadium view from above

1989 establishments in North Korea
Athletics (track and field) venues in North Korea
Event venues established in 1989
Football venues in North Korea
Multi-purpose stadiums in North Korea
North Korea
Sports venues completed in 1989
Sports venues in Pyongyang
20th-century architecture in North Korea